David Pol (born August 31, 1973) is a former Canadian football offensive tackle who played one season with the Calgary Stampeders of the Canadian Football League. He was drafted by the BC Lions in the second round of the 1999 CFL Draft. Pol played CIS football at the University of British Columbia. He was also a member of the BC Lions, Hamilton Tiger-Cats and Toronto Argonauts.

External links
Just Sports Stats
CFLapedia stats

Living people
1973 births
Players of Canadian football from British Columbia
Canadian football offensive linemen
UBC Thunderbirds football players
BC Lions players
Hamilton Tiger-Cats players
Toronto Argonauts players
Calgary Stampeders players
People from New Westminster